Robert de Neville, 2nd Baron Neville of Raby (c. 1223–1282), was a medieval English nobleman.

Background 
The Neville family in England go back to at least the 11th century, and the historian Horace Round speculated that they were part of the pre-Norman aristocracy of Northumbria. By the 13th century, the Nevilles had become, through shrewd marriages and royal patronage, major landholders, and concomitantly rose to a position of regional hegemony regularly being appointed to the important royal offices. By the time Neville reached adulthood, and for the rest of his life, English politics was in a state of partisanship; the King, Henry III was increasingly unpopular with his nobility and the tension between them, never resolved, erupted in constitutional crisis and eventually civil war. Simon de Montfort, previously a favourite of Henry's, who had married his sister Eleanor, led the opposition.

Early life 
Robert de Neville was the eldest son of Geoffrey fitz Robert (later Geoffrey de Neville, d. c. 1242), and the grandson of Robert fitz Meldred, Lord of Raby. The identity of Robert de Neville's mother, however, is disputed among scholars. A. F. Pollard, for example, writing in the Dictionary of National Biography in 1894 suggested that she was Margaret, daughter of Sir John de Longvillers. However, this Margaret was married until 1285, and there is evidence from a Lincolnshire fine of 1247 which refers to one Robert de Neville, knight, and his mother, Joan. Robert had younger brothers, Geoffrey—who was to start a cadet branch of the family in Hornby, Lancashire—John, and Hugh.

Inheritance and estates 
Robert possessed estates in Burreth, Lincolnshire by 1242 and on his father's death in 1254 he succeeded to his patrimony, including the Lordship of Raby and Brancepeth in Durham; he performed fealty to the king on 7 May that year following the deaths of his grandmother and grandfather, from whom he received further lands. They probably included the manors of Ulnaby and Carlbury. However, notes Young, the nature of the surviving evidence—mostly existing in the form of the inquisition post mortem taken after his death—is not sufficient for scholars to make anything other than "an approximate estimate of their wealth". The medievalist Matthew Holford described de Neville as having "united the inheritances of Bulmer and Meldred".

Northern and national politics 
De Neville became increasingly important in the politics and society of northeastern England during the mid-1250s, and by 1258 he had been appointed Sheriff of Northumberland. The strategic proximity of Northumberland to the border with Scotland made this an important post for pushing the boundaries of English influence into Scottish affairs, as well as escorting and receiving embassies; accompanied by William de Latimer, then Sheriff of York, he travelled to Scotland on royal business in April 1258 with orders to assist the Scottish king in crushing a revolt by his own nobles. De Neville attended a large assembly in York between the 7th and 26 September 1268 with the King. This was the official setting for a meeting between Henry III and his son-in-law, the King of Scotland; with the latter came Henry's daughter, Margaret, Queen of Scotland. During this meeting, de Neville witnessed a large number of both royal and private charters. De Neville played a leading role in the administration of border society, including the organisation of truces, resolution of disputes and collecting protection money. He was also close to the Bishops of Duham, Robert and Antony, for whom de Neville witnessed many charters over the years, and with whose steward, Guichard de Charron, de Neville was an itinerant justice in 1278–1279, although this was the only time he held the office.

In 1263, de Neville was entrusted with the defence of York and all of England north of the River Trent, as well as being appointed Sheriff of Yorkshire. 
and was also appointed governor of Norham and Werk castles, which had previously been held by Robert de Ros and the Bishops of Durham respectively.

Royal service 
Even before his father's death, Robert was performing minor services for King Henry III in the North of England; in 1251, for example, he was dispatched to gather buck deer from the royal forest of Galtres for Henry's Christmas feast at Westminster Palace. In return, the following year de Neville was granted the right to enclose land for his own harvesting at nearby Sutton in Galtres. This was followed by further grants over the next few years, which included deer for his park and a license to hunt hares, foxes and cats with his dogs. In August 1257 he fought on campaign in Wales. At various points in his career de Neville was custodian of royal castles in the north, including Bamburgh, Newcastle, Scarborough and York; de Neville calculated that the constableship of Bamburgh cost him 1,200 marks alone, although the historian Charles Young calls this figure "somewhat inflated". De Neville's primary use to the King at this time was diplomatic, however, rather than military. With conflict looming, as constable of York and Bamburgh Castles, de Neville promised to "surrender it to the king and his heirs and to no other, and this by the council of the king and not otherwise". In 1261 de Neville was appointed Chief Justice of forests beyond the Trent, with responsibility for hearing forest pleas replacing John d'Eyvill.

Civil War 

With the decline in relations between King Henry and a number of his barons, led by Simon de Montfort, de Neville's role was to become a military one.

De Neville, as constable of Bamburgh Castle, is mentioned "incidentally" on the rebel barons' Provisions of Oxford, which they promulgated in 1258, as an acceptable royalist whom they could trust with custody of royal castles; the rebels also appointed him Sheriff of Northumberland, where they were strongest in the north. In 1263—at the time, constable of Devizes Castle—de Neville was part of the group of barons sympathetic to the King in his struggle with Simon de Montfort, Earl of Leicester over political reform. Neville sought the intervention of King Louis IX of France to arbitrate in December 1263. The first violence took place in June 1263 when de Montfort and his men led a chevauchée through the lands of the King's favourites, collectively nicknamed the Savoyards on account of where they had come from. King Henry—"belatedly", comments the historian Fergus Oakes—organised his military response, making de Neville responsible for the royal lands in Yorkshire, Lincolnshire and Durham, whom Young notes had "remained a King's man". He was personally instructed to deal vigorously with those who "devastate the lands of the king's faithful men by fire, plunder and other means". Oakes calls de Neville's prospects of doing so "daunting", not least on account of the sheer extent of the region he was now responsible for—around one-third of the Kingdom. This led to de Neville writing to the Chancellor, William of Merton, protesting that his task "not possible without great expense" and that he had "been led...to beg your counsel and help...in order to signify to me where and from whence...I shall be able to acquire the money for the custody of the aforementioned county and castle of York". De Neville also wrote to King Henry personally, complaining that "many I meet with are tepid in their responses to the conservation of the peace of your majesty's dignity", and he implored Henry to send his nobility "in these parts your letters...that they may be appointed to aid my person...to resist the evils of the before said rebels".

The civil war had impacted substantially upon de Neville's ability to perform his royal duties, he claimed in 1269, and he had been unable to regularly collect—and so could not be held responsible for —the royal farm thanks to the criminal activities of John d'Eyville. D'Eyville, a firm and energetic supporter of de Montfort, with other barons, had severely disrupted local society, said de Neville, from Michaelmas 1263 until the Battle of Lewes on 14 May 1264, after which de Montfort appointed another person sheriff. Following de Montfort's victory at Lewes, de Neville was summoned to meet in London with the earl on 3 June 1264 to provide the new regime with counsel; he was back in London the next month, having been summoned with a force of men to repel an expected French invasion which did not, in the event, occur. King Henry had been captured at Lewes, and was now effectively a puppet King for de Montfort, but de Neville appears to have remained openly defiant to de Montfort's rule and refused to surrender Bamburgh or York Castles to the new regime, reflecting his earlier promise to the crown. De Neville's position, says Young, "is especially noteworthy in that other barons in the north, including John d'Eyvill, who had preceded Robert as Chief Justice of the Forest and had been associated with him in other royal service, now gave their allegiance to the Montfort government". This period has been described as "excessively demanding" for de Neville, who was repeatedly threatened with the confiscation of his estates if he did not surrender the castles. The historian Helen M. Jewell has noted that on top having to support the King during the civil war, de Neville also had to carry out his usual military and official duties, such as the Welsh campaigns of the 1250s and 1260s (which resulted in the Treaty of Montgomery in 1267 and attendance at parliament in 1265.

Young suggests that de Neville was tangentially the cause of de Montfort's eventual defeat at the Battle of Evesham on 4 August 1265 through what Young describes as a chain reaction. The Earl of Gloucester was standing surety for de Neville's good behaviour, and the new government tried to force him to bring de Neville to London; de Clare not only refused, but proceeded to change sides. Gloucester's support was essential to Edward's later victory at Evesham as a result.

Later career 
Although de Montfort had been defeated and killed at Evesham, and Henry restored to independent rule, a groundswell of support for him and his reform movement remained; much of both the crown's and de Neville's energies over the following few years was devoted to neutralising it. He was reappointed Chief Justice of the Northern Forests and also made a Keeper of the peace for Cumberland, Lancashire, Northumberland, Westmorland and Yorkshire. He was also appointed to repeated judicial commissions, and in 1276—having pledged his homage to the new kIng, Henry's son Edward I—de Neville was commissioned to hear the pleas of the so-called "Disinherited" rebels with Henry de Bratton. They included de Neville's cousin, Hugh de Neville, who had fought with de Montfort at Lewes, where he commanded a troop. De Neville has been described as a "staunch royalist" during the civil war, and Cokayne says de Neville "stood firmly" with the royal party. However, Jewell notes that, in 1267, he was required to meet with the King at Kenilworth Castle and there make his peace. This act that, she says, "jars" with his presumed loyalism. Kenilworth—de Montfort's chief residence until his death, and now holding out against the King—was almost impregnable, being surrounded by a river and a moat, and de Neville assisted the King's efforts in dislodging the remaining rebels. In what Young has called de Neville's final service for the King against the rebellion, on 17 September 1267, he was appointed an executor of the Dictum of Kenilworth in the East Midlands and the Thames Valley, which officially made the final peace between the crown and the last of de Montfort's followers. One of his roles involved witnessing the charters of mortgage that the rebels made in order to receive back their lands.

De Neville continued to perform administrative duties, however, sitting on various commissions of Oyer and terminer and responsible for the collection of the fifteenth and tenth tax in Northumberland and Westmorland in 1275. The following year he was at the Council of Westminster as a member of the Royal council that declared Llywelyn ap Gruffudd a rebel, leading to the invasion of Wales the following year. The same council also heard Gilbert, Earl of Gloucester's claim to Bristol Castle, traditionally claimed by the de Clares but held by the crown, and dismissed it for good.

Illness and death 
The invasion of Wales continued into 1277, and de Neville was summoned to join the King's army. However, de Neville sent the King his son John to fight in his place. Summoned again the following year, he claimed exception on account of physical infirmity; he was dead by 20 August 1282. It is not known where he was buried, although Jewell notes that both Greyfriars and Blackfriars in York, and Staindrop Church have all been suggested as likely sites. His will was executed by his brother, Geoffrey; by the time of his death he was the most powerful noble in Durham.

Marriage and family 
Robert de Neville is known to have married twice. His first marriage, to Isabel de Byron, took an active part in her husband's legal affairs and provided him with children, all sons, although his heir, also a Robert, predeceased his father in 1271. Robert the younger's son, Ralph, thus inherited his grandfather's titles and lands, and was elevated to the peerage as the first Baron Neville. Robert the younger had married Mary fitz Ranulf (or Fitzrandolph), who inherited Middleham Castle from her father and so brought it to the Neville family. Robert the elder's second wife was Ida, daughter of Sir Robert Bertram of Mitford. She remarried in 1285 to Robert Lumley.

Notes

References

Bibliography 

 
 
 
  
 
 
 

 
 
 
 
 
 
 
 
 
 
 
 
 
 
 
 
 
 

1220s births
1282 deaths
Year of birth uncertain
13th-century English nobility
Neville family